Les deux aveugles de Tolède (The Two Blind Men of Toledo) is an opéra comique in one act by the French composer Étienne Méhul. It premiered at the Opéra-Comique, Paris on 28 January 1806. The libretto, by Benoît-Joseph Marsollier, is a revision of the same author's Les deux aveugles de Bagdad, set by A.J. Fournier in 1782.  

Contemporary reviewers praised Méhul's music while criticising the weakness of the libretto. The opera only enjoyed limited success, with 19 performances in 1806, plus one on 28 October 1809 and a final one on 22 May 1810. The overture provides local Spanish colour through the use of a bolero rhythm.

Roles

Recordings
The overture appears on: Méhul Overtures, Orchestre de Bretagne, conducted by Stefan Sanderling (ASV, 2002).

References

Sources
Adélaïde de Place Étienne Nicolas Méhul (Bleu Nuit Éditeur, 2005)
Arthur Pougin Méhul: sa vie, son génie, son caractère (Fischbacher, 1889)General introduction to Méhul's operas in the  introduction to the edition of Stratonice by M. Elizabeth C. Bartlet (Pendragon Press, 1997)
Ates Orga: booklet notes to the Sanderling recording

External links
Score: Les Deux aveugles de Tolède, opéra-comique en 1 acte et en prose, paroles de Mr Marsolier, représenté pour le 1re fois à Paris, sur le Théâtre de l'opéra-comique par les comédiens ordinaires de l'Empereur, le mardi 28 janvier 1806'', Paris : Magasin de Musique dirigé par MM.rs Cherubuni, Méhul Kreutzer, Rode, N. Edouard et Boieldieu , [s.d.] (Gallica - B.N.F.)

Operas by Étienne Méhul
1806 operas
Opéras comiques
French-language operas
Operas
One-act operas
Operas set in Spain